Francisco Maciel (born 1964) is a Mexican tennis player.

Francisco Maciel may also refer to:
 Francisco Antonio Maciel (1757–1807), Montevidean industrialist and philanthropist
 Francisco Diego Maciel (born 1977), Argentine footballer